Martyn Pushkar (died 1 June 1658) was a Ukrainian Cossack military leader. From 1648 he was polkovnik of Poltava regiment. After Bohdan Khmelnytsky's death, Pushkar, being one of the senior colonels in the Hetman State, was considered a candidate for the hetmancy, but Ivan Vyhovsky was elected instead. Together with Iakiv Barabash Pushkar led an uprising against Vyhovsky in 1657. After inflicting several defeats on Vyhovsky's Cossacks and his Crimean allies, Martyn Pushkar was killed in a battle near his native Poltava on 1 June 1658. His rebellion ended in failure. He founded the Exaltation of the Cross Monastery, which was built in a Cossack Baroque style in Poltava, to commemorate a victory over the Poles.

References 
 Martyn Pushkar in Internet Encyclopedia of Ukraine

Literature 

 Кривошея В. «Еліти нації і еліта суспільства»: (або деякі питання української генеалогії) / Розбудова держави — 1997 — No. 11. — С. 48-55
 Горобець В. Мартин Пушкар / «Історія України в особах: козаччина». — К. : Україна, 2000. — С. 84-92
 Мокляк В. «Полтавщина козацька (від Люблінської унії до Коломацької ради» / 2008. — 264 с.
 Енциклопедія українознавства : Словникова частина : в 11 т. / Наукове Товариство ім. Шевченка ; гол. ред. проф., д-р Володимир Кубійович. — Париж ; Нью-Йорк ; Львів : Молоде життя, 1954–2003.

Cossack rebels
Zaporozhian Cossack military personnel of the Khmelnytsky Uprising
1658 deaths
17th-century Ukrainian people
Year of birth unknown
Military personnel killed in action
Colonels of the Cossack Hetmanate